The Bulgarian Helsinki Committee is an independent non-governmental organization for human rights founded on July 14, 1992 in Sofia, Bulgaria. Its main objectives are protection and promotion of human rights in Bulgaria. With more than 30 associates, the Bulgarian Helsinki Committee is the largest human rights watchdog in the country.

History 

The Bulgarian Helsinki Committee was founded on July 14, 1992 with a headquarters in Sofia, Bulgaria. The organization was a member of the Vienna Based International Helsinki Federation until its insolvency in 2007. Nowadays it is an independent organization. The Committee is registered with the Bulgarian Central registry of non-profit organization in public benefit.

Objectives 

The Bulgarian Helsinki Committee objectives are protection and promotion with focus on minorities and the vulnerable groups of the society. The organization actively lobbies for legislative reforms in the field of human rights, it is actively involved in public debates on human rights issues and carries out advocacy for the protection of human rights. The Committee is also involved in human rights education, organizes conferences, workshops, public actions and other forms of public activities with focus human rights.

Structure 

The Bulgarian Helsinki Committee is managed by two bodies: General Meeting and Management Committee. The General Meeting is the supreme body of the organization and includes all members of the Committee (25 members as of early 2013). Management Committee is appointed by the General meeting and it has executive functions.

Programs 

The Bulgarian Helsinki Committee works through five programmes: Programming and administration programme, Legal Defence Programme, Monitoring and research programme, Campaigns and communications programme and Legal protection of refugees and migrants programme.

The organization publishes a monthly magazine.

Funding

The Committee is a nonprofit organization funded and it is entirely funded by donations. In the recent years the largest donors have been public and private organizations such as Leon Levy Foundation, Open Society Foundations, Oak Foundation, United Nations High Commissioner for Refugees, EU Fundamental Rights Agency, the European Commission, United States Agency for International Development.

References

External links 

The Bulgarian Helsinki Committee

Human rights organizations based in Bulgaria